Liu Dongdong (October 1945 – 25 February 2015) was a general (shangjiang) of the People's Liberation Army of China. He served as political commissar of the Jinan Military Region.

Biography 
Liu was born in Huangpi, Hubei Province in 1945. He joined the army in 1961, and the Chinese Communist Party in 1963. He attained the rank of major general in 1992, lieutenant general in 1999, and full general in 2004. He died in Beijing on 25 February 2015, at the age of 69.

Liu was a member of the 16th and 17th Central Committees of the Chinese Communist Party.

References

1945 births
2015 deaths
People's Liberation Army generals from Hubei
Politicians from Wuhan
Members of the 16th Central Committee of the Chinese Communist Party
Members of the 17th Central Committee of the Chinese Communist Party
Chinese Communist Party politicians from Hubei
People's Republic of China politicians from Hubei